Modern Combat is a series of shooter video games developed and published by Gameloft mainly for Android and iOS. All installments in the series play similarly to that of the Call of Duty and Battlefield franchises and feature multiple missions in varied environments with different tasks for players to complete. The main enemies in the games are terrorists, and often, the player is accompanied by other soldiers who fight alongside them. Modern Combat: Sandstorm is the first game in the Modern Combat series and was followed by 2010's Modern Combat 2: Black Pegasus, 2011's Modern Combat 3: Fallen Nation, 2012's Modern Combat 4: Zero Hour, 2014's Modern Combat 5: Blackout, and 2017’s Modern Combat: Versus.

Video games

Reception

The 5 main entries of the series have been met with mainly positive reviews from critics, while the spin-off games Modern Combat: Domination and Modern Combat: Versus received mixed reviews.

References

First-person shooter multiplayer online games
Gameloft games
Vivendi franchises
IOS games
Android (operating system) games
BlackBerry games
Bada games
BlackBerry 10 games
Windows Phone games
Video games developed in Canada
Video games developed in France
Video game franchises
Video game franchises introduced in 2009